Francis Edward Lauricella, known as Hank Lauricella (October 9, 1930 – March 25, 2014), was a real estate developer from suburban New Orleans, Louisiana, a college football legend, and a member of both houses of the Louisiana State Legislature.

High school career 
Lauricella was a star at Holy Cross High School in New Orleans, Louisiana.  His team there won the city championship in 1947, using the single wing offense.

College career 
Lauricella played under coach Robert Neyland at the University of Tennessee from 1949 to 1951.  He was a member of the 1950 National Championship team and the 1951 National Championship team.  Lauricella gained fame as the running back in the single wing offense, at the time that most schools had switched to the T-formation.  At that position, Lauricella was responsible for the majority of the rushing and passing.  D

In 1951, Lauricella was named as an All American and was the first runner up in the Heisman Trophy voting to Dick Kazmaier of Princeton University. He was elected to the College Football Hall of Fame in 1981.

Sources 

 2006 University of Tennessee Football Media Guide

External links
 

1930 births
2014 deaths
All-American college football players
Tennessee Volunteers football players
American football running backs
Dallas Texans (NFL) players
College Football Hall of Fame inductees
Members of the Louisiana House of Representatives
Louisiana state senators
Louisiana Democrats
Louisiana Republicans
American athlete-politicians
Players of American football from New Orleans
People from Harahan, Louisiana
Holy Cross High School, New Orleans alumni
University of Tennessee alumni
American real estate businesspeople
Businesspeople from Louisiana
United States Army officers
Catholics from Louisiana
20th-century American businesspeople